Seastar Bakery was a bakery in Portland, Oregon. The business closed in August 2022.

Description and history

The business was owned and operated by Annie Moss and Katia Bezerra-Clark, and shared a space with Handsome Pizza in northeast Portland's Vernon neighborhood since 2015. Seastar's menu included breads (sourdough and rye), cookies, English muffins, pastries, buckwheat scones, and toast. Toast toppings included fruit, coconut-honey butter, and honey-nut butter, as well as coppa, pickles, and a fried egg. On weekends, Seastar served chai lattes, as of 2021. The bakery and pizzeria shared a custom wood-fired oven.

According to Eater Portland, "This Killingsworth bakery uses Pacific Northwestern flours and Oregon produce in its flavorful breads, chewy cookies, and ultra-flaky cinnamon rolls, but what really sets Seastar apart is its use of savory herbs and spices in its baked goods — we're talking sage in a glaze on a molasses cookie, or turmeric in a moist muffin." Seastar uses Camas Country Mill flour for croissants.

In 2020, during the COVID-19 pandemic, the bakery also offered baking ingredients such as eggs, flour, and yeast. Seastar reportedly sold 600 pounds of Camas Country Mill flour in two days in April 2020. Seastar was open for takeout and outdoor dining during the pandemic, but owners did not allow indoor dining until all staff were vaccinated. Face masks were still required, as of April 2022.

In 2022, owners announced plans to close on August 14.

Reception
In 2017, Samantha Bakall included the fancy toast Little Beirut in The Oregonian "cheap eats" list of "99 delicious dishes for $10 and under". Michelle Lopez included the Patsy’s Biscuit in Eater Portland 2018 list of "15 Portland Biscuits That Would Make Any Southerner Proud". The website's Nick Townsend included Seastar a 2021 list of "11 Places to Find Charming Chai Lattes in Portland". He described the chai latte as "distinctly peppery and restrained in its sweetness" and a "hidden gem on the menu". Eater Portland Michelle Lopez and Brooke Jackson-Glidden included Seastar in a 2022 list of "Outstanding Bakeries in Portland and Beyond". In 2022, Seastar was included in Portland Monthly "Opinionated Guide to Portland's Best Bakeries". The magazine's Katherine Chew Hamilton wrote, "These grain-centric baked goods are part free-spirited Portland and part French finesse, united by a love for butter."

See also 

 List of bakeries
 List of defunct restaurants of the United States

References

External links

 
 Seastar Bakery at Thrillist
 Seastar Bakery at Zomato

2022 disestablishments in Oregon
Bakeries of Oregon
Defunct bakeries of the United States
Defunct restaurants in Portland, Oregon
Restaurants disestablished in 2022
Vernon, Portland, Oregon